Rhodes Reason (April 19, 1930 – December 26, 2014) was an American actor who appeared in more than 200 roles in television, film, and stage.

Film and television career
Reason was born in Glendale in Los Angeles County, California, the son of Rex G. Reason and the former Jean Robinson. The younger brother of actor Rex Reason, Rhodes Reason made his acting start at the age of 18 in a production of Romeo and Juliet directed by Charles Laughton.

Among his starring roles were parts in King Kong Escapes (1967); 39 episodes of the British television series White Hunter (TV series), (1957); and as Sheriff Will Mayberry in the ABC drama series Bus Stop.  Reason was cast as Chuck Wilson in "Rodeo Round-Up" in 1956 and as Kinnard in "Dust of Destruction", episodes of the western aviation adventure series, Sky King, episode "Conflict" in the "Rifleman" as Ben Kendrick.

Reason had a major part in an episode of the ABC/Warner Bros. western series, Sugarfoot in the segment "Strange Land" (1957). Reason was a guest star in Frontier Doctor, a syndicated western series. He was cast as Black Jack in the episode "The Homesteaders" (1958). Another ABC/WB western series Reason appeared in was Colt .45, as Ben Thompson in the episode "Appointment in Agoura" (1960); Reason also appeared in The Rifleman. 

Reason guest starred on Tales of the Texas Rangers, Maverick (1957 episode "Ghost Rider"), Tombstone Territory (1957 episode "Ambush at Gila Gulch"), Perry Mason as Martin Eldridge in the 1966 episode, "The Case of the Bogus Buccaneers", 77 Sunset Strip (1958), Bourbon Street Beat (1960), The Time Tunnel (1966),  The Big Valley (the episode "Plunder" in 1967), The Lucy Show (also 1967), Star Trek in 1967 as gladiator Flavius Maximus ("Bread and Circuses", 1968), Here's Lucy (also 1968), and The Bob Newhart Show (1976).

Reason appeared as Peter Jeffries in the 1955 episode, "California's First Ice Man" of the western television anthology series, Death Valley Days.

His feature film appearances include Yellowstone Kelly (1959, with Clint Walker) and A Fever in the Blood (1961).  In the early 1980s, he starred in the Broadway musical Annie, playing Daddy Warbucks for nearly three years.

Reason died in Palm Springs at the age of 84 of lymphoma.

Filmography

References

External links

Rhodes Reason at the American Film Institute Catalog of Motion Pictures
Rhodes Reason at AllMovie

Obituary in The Desert Sun (February 8, 2015)

1930 births
2014 deaths
American male television actors
American male film actors
Male actors from Glendale, California
Male actors from Los Angeles
Male actors from Palm Springs, California
20th-century American male actors